Andritsos is a Greek surname. Notable people with the surname include: 

Kostas Andritsos (1916–1993), Greek film director and writer
Liveris Andritsos (born 1959), Greek basketball player and coach

Greek-language surnames